International Orange! is the seventh studio album by the alternative rock band Firewater (their sixth album of original songs), released on September 11, 2012, through Bloodshot Records. It was recorded in Istanbul.

Track listing

Charts

Personnel 
Firewater
Tod Ashley – vocals, electric guitar, melodica, bongos, loops, arrangement, production, photography, design
Yonadav Halevy – drums, percussion
Stefano Iascone – trumpet
Çosar Kamçı – darbuka, daf
Uri Brauner Kinrot – electric guitar
Massimo Piredda – trombone
Adam Scheflan – bass guitar
Additional musicians and production
John Dent – mastering
Johnny Kalsi – dhol and loops on "The Monkey Song"
Tamir Muskat – mixing, production and drums on "A Little Revolution", percussion on "Glitter Days" and "Strange Life"
Marco Pampaluna – horn arrangement on "Glitter Days" and "The Monkey Song"
Ferdi Seçkin – zurna on "Glitter Days" and "Strange Life"
Nimrod Talmon – trombone on "A Little Revolution" and "Dead Man's Boots", melodica on "Nowhere to Be Found"
Itamar Ziegler – bass guitar on "A Little Revolution"

References

External links 
 

2012 albums
Bloodshot Records albums
Firewater (band) albums